Otopharynx selenurus is a species of cichlid endemic to Lake Malawi, an African Great Lake. This species can reach a length of  total length (TL). It can be found in the aquarium trade.

References

selenurus
Fish described in 1922
Taxonomy articles created by Polbot